Pedro Lopes may refer to:

 Pedro Santana Lopes (born 1956), Portuguese lawyer and politician; Prime Minister of Portugal, 2004 to 2005
 Pedro Lopes (soccer), retired American soccer player

See also 
 Pedro López (disambiguation)